Arising Empire is a German record label, founded in 2015, which focuses on punk, rock and metalcore music.

History

Arising Empire was founded in 2015 by Markus Staiger and former "People Like You Records" manager Tobbe Falarz.
It was, besides the former subsidiary company SharpTone Records, which was founded shortly after Arising Empire, a sub-label of Nuclear Blast. The distribution was taken on by Warner Music at the time.

The first bands, signed by the label were Amor, Imminence, Novelists and GWLT.

The first release of the label was the album Souvenirs from the French progressive metalcore band Novelists, on 11 November 2015.

In June 2020, Arising Empire was acquired by Kontor Records.

Artists

External links
 Official Website

References

German record labels